The American Chamber of Commerce to the European Union (AmCham EU) speaks for American business "committed to Europe on trade, investment and competitiveness issues. The stated mission of the organization is to ensure a growth-orientated business and investment climate in Europe. AmCham EU seeks to facilitate the resolution of transatlantic issues that impact business and plays a role in creating better understanding of EU and US positions on business matters.  Aggregate US investment in Europe totalled more than  €2 trillion in 2015, directly supports more than 4.3 million jobs in Europe, and generates billions of euros annually in income, trade and research and development."

AmCham EU is dedicated to promoting jobs and growth in Europe as well as helping its member companies build relationships and interact with decision-makers throughout Europe. It aims at influencing the EU policy agenda by creating dialogue and debate, and by boosting company profiles.

History 

The American Chamber of Commerce to the European Union has its roots in the committee structure of the American Chamber of Commerce to Belgium. Starting off in the form of the ‘Common Market Panel’ in the early 1960s, the organisation evolved over the years first to the ‘EEC Committee’ in 1978, then to the ‘EU Committee’ in 1995.

The EU Committee changed its name to AmCham EU in 2003 and became an independent organisation on January 1, 2004. In 2013, it celebrated its 50th anniversary.

AmCham EU is a Belgian not-for-profit organisation with its own secretariat and annual budget. AmCham EU has an Executive Council, a group of executives responsible for European operations of US multinationals.

Role and Purpose 

The primary purpose of both AmCham EU and the Executive Council is to play an active role in the successful development of the Single Market throughout all EU Member States. They therefore direct their energies towards the EU institutions, the EU Member States, the wider Europe and the US.

AmCham EU seeks to serve as an independent source of quality information and analysis. Through participation in working policy groups, members prioritise issues, develop position papers, organise meetings, workshops, seminars and conferences which provide a platform for open exchange of information and ideas.

The vision of AmCham EU is to be:

 The most effective advocacy force in the EU;
 The representation body for US business in the EU; and
 A trusted discussion partner for European institutions and governments.

AmCham EU believes in deepening and widening the EU Single Market, achieving a low-carbon economy, driving innovation, increasing trade and investment, and better preparing the workforce to meet future demands. By helping drive the transatlantic economy, AmCham EU shows it is heavily invested in and committed to Europe.

This membership-led and membership driven organisation is currently chaired by Karl Cox, Vice President of Global Public Affairs, Oracle Corporation. The Chief Executive Officer is Susan Danger, who oversees a secretariat of over 20 professional staff.

Policy Committees 

 Agriculture & Food
 Competition Policy
 Consumer Affairs
 Customs & Trade Facilitation
 Digital Economy
 Employment & Social Affairs
 Environment
 EU Tax
 Financial Services 
 Healthcare
 Institutional Affairs
 Intellectual Property
 Security & Defence
 Trade & External Relations
 Transport, Energy & Climate

Advocacy and Communications 

AmCham EU's publications are distributed in Brussels and throughout Europe. In communicating its views to the institutions via position statements, publications, meetings, newsletters, its website and social networks, AmCham EU's primary role continues to be the contribution to the development of policy and legislation at the drafting stage, thereby playing an important role in the development of Europe's economy.

Membership 

AmCham EU's membership currently comprises more than 160 companies, the majority of which are US multinational corporations. Members include some of the world's biggest brands and leading multinationals from across all industries and business sectors. Although 25% of the members are law firms and public affairs consultancies, there are also a small number of international corporations who have demonstrated strong US business links.

American Chambers of Commerce in Europe (AmChams in Europe) 

AmCham EU is a member of AmChams in Europe (ACE), which is a network of approximately 45 American Chambers of Commerce across Europe. The Chair of ACE is Patrick Mikkelsen, Executive Director of AmCham Netherlands.

See also
 Chamber of Commerce
 European American
 United States Chamber of Commerce

References 

American Chambers of commerce
Trade associations based in Belgium
Pan-European trade and professional organizations
Advocacy groups